West Barsham is a village and former civil parish, now in the parish of Barsham, in the North Norfolk district, in the county of Norfolk, England. In 1931 the parish had a population of 89. On 1 April 1935 the parish was abolished to form Barsham.

The village is one of four settlements within the parish of Barsham. The other villages are North Barsham, East Barsham and Houghton St Giles.

West Barsham is 3.2 miles north of the town of Fakenham, 24.1 miles west of Cromer and 117 miles north of London. The nearest railway station is at Sheringham for the Bittern Line which runs between Sheringham, Cromer and Norwich. The nearest airport is Norwich International Airport.

References

External links

 

Villages in Norfolk
Former civil parishes in Norfolk
North Norfolk